The 2008 Super 14 season started in February 2008 with pre-season matches held from mid-January. It finished on 31 May, when the Crusaders won their seventh Super Rugby title with a 20–12 victory over the Waratahs in front of the Crusaders' home fans at AMI Stadium. The 2008 season was the third of the expansion, which led to the name change to the Super 14. The schedule, which covered 3½ months, featured a total of 94 matches, with each team playing one full round robin against the 13 other teams, two semi-finals and a final. Every team received one bye over the 14 rounds.

Introduction of Experimental law variations

The 2008 competition is currently the highest level competition to trial any of the International Rugby Board's (IRB) Experimental law variations (ELVs). The laws had been trialled in various competitions in both the Northern and Southern Hemisphere. The highest level competition the laws had previously been introduced to was the 2007 Australian Rugby Championship. The introduction of the laws for the 2008 season was approved by the competition's governing body, SANZAR, at a meeting on 4 December 2007.

SANZAR decided not to adopt all the ELVs, and decided to adopt the following:
The corner posts are moved so that they are outside the junction of the touchline and goal-line. A player will also not be in touch if they are touching the corner post unless they are also touching either the touchline, or ground over the touchline.
A ball can be thrown backwards on a quick throw-in rather than having to be thrown straight.
The offside line will now occur immediately once a tackle is made.
At the breakdown the Scrum-half (half-back) cannot be touched unless they are touching the ball.
During a scrum, with the exception of forwards in the scrum, and each team's scrum-half, the offside line will now be 5 metres behind the hindmost foot of a scrum.
With the exception of offside, not entering the breakdown through the gate, and foul-play, the punishment will be a free kick.

Table

Results

Round 1

Round 2

Round 3

Round 4

Round 5

Round 6

Round 7

Round 8

Round 9

Round 10

Round 11

Round 12

Round 13

Round 14

Finals

Semi finals

Grand final
The final of the 2008 Super 14 season took place on 31 May 2008 at AMI Stadium in Christchurch, New Zealand. The match was hosted by the Crusaders who defeated the New South Wales Waratahs by 20 points to 12.

The match
First half
The Crusaders scored the first points of the game when fly-half Dan Carter kicked a penalty in the fourth minute, giving the Crusaders a 3–0 lead. The Waratahs scored their first points of the match when Kurtley Beale kicked the ball across field, and Waratah's winger Lachlan Turner caught the ball to score a try. The attempted conversion by Beale was unsuccessful, leaving the Waratahs with a 5-3 lead.

The next score occurred in the 25th minute when Waratahs flanker Phil Waugh intercepted a pass from Dan Carter. Waugh passed to Turner who chipped the ball and then collected to score his second try. Beale's conversion was successful and the Waratahs extended their lead to 12–3. Carter kicked a penalty in the 32nd minute to reduce the Waratahs lead to 12–6. The final score before half time came in the 38th minute when Crusaders No. 8 Mose Tuiali'i scored in the right hand corner. Carter's conversion was unsuccessful, and the half ended with the Waratahs leading by 12 points to 11.

Second half
In the 46th minute the Crusaders took the lead again by 14 points to 12 via a Dan Carter penalty. The Crusaders looked to have scored their second try in the 56th minute when prop Wyatt Crockett landed on a loose ball in the Waratahs in-goal area, but play was taken back 60 metres after touch judge Cobus Wessels reported that Crusaders lock Brad Thorn had thrown a punch. The try was disallowed and the Crusaders penalised. Thorn was given a yellow card and sent to the sin bin for ten minutes.

Despite having an extra man for the next ten minutes, the Waratahs were unable to score, and were further hampered by the loss of Kurtley Beale to injury. In the 70th minute Carter kicked a drop-goal to take the Crusaders lead to 17–12, and four minutes later kicked a penalty to further extend the lead to 20–12. With only minutes remaining Crusaders winger Scott Hamilton dropped the ball only metres from the Waratahs try-line. The score remained at 20-12, and the Crusaders won their seventh Super rugby title.

Match details

Player statistics

Leading try scorers

Leading point scorers

Attendances

References

External links

 
2008
 
 
 
2008 rugby union tournaments for clubs